"Good Drank" is a song by American rapper 2 Chainz, featuring Quavo and Gucci Mane, and was originally released on October 19, 2016 as a promotional single from his mixtape, Hibachi for Lunch; although it was later removed from the tracklist and released on January 20, 2017 as the lead single from his fourth studio album Pretty Girls Like Trap Music. This track was produced by Mike Dean.

Music video
A music video was released on January 19, 2017 on 2 Chainz's Vevo account on YouTube. The video features everyone dressed in vintage clothing, referencing The Prohibition Era, transporting purple drank instead of alcohol.

Commercial performance
"Good Drank" debuted at number 92 on the US Billboard Hot 100 for the week of February 11, 2017. It later peaked at number 70, spending 16 weeks on the charts.

Charts

Weekly charts

Year-end charts

Certifications

Release history

References

External links

2016 songs
2017 singles
2 Chainz songs
Gucci Mane songs
Songs written by 2 Chainz
Songs written by Mike Dean (record producer)
Def Jam Recordings singles
Songs written by Gucci Mane
Black-and-white music videos
Quavo songs
Songs written by Quavo